The Federation of Malaya sent teams to three Commonwealth Games. Their first were in 1950, and they also attended in 1958 and 1962. They won seven medals, all in Weightlifting. Athletes from Malaya continued to compete for Malaysia when that country was established in 1963.

British North Borneo (NB) (now Sabah) and Sarawak (SAR) also competed separately at the 1958 and 1962 Games (but not winning any medals), and competed as part of Malaysia from 1966.

List of medalists

Medals by Games

Medals by sport

References

 Official results by country

 
Nations at the Commonwealth Games
Malaysia and the Commonwealth of Nations